The 2015–16 season was Celje's 25th season in the Slovenian PrvaLiga, Slovenian top division, since the league was created in 1991 with Celje as one of the league's founding members. Celje competed in the PrvaLiga, Cup and Europa League. The season for the club began on 2 July 2015 and ended on 25 May 2016.

Players
As of 1 March 2016

Source:NK Celje

Competitions

Overall

Overview
{| class="wikitable" style="text-align: center"
|-
!rowspan=2|Competition
!colspan=8|Record
|-
!
!
!
!
!
!
!
!
|-
| PrvaLiga

|-
| Cup

|-
| Europa League

|-
! Total

PrvaLiga

League table

Results summary

Results by round

Matches

Cup

Round of 16

Quarter-finals

Semi-finals

Final

UEFA Europa League

First qualifying round

Statistics

Squad statistics

Goalscorers

See also
2015–16 Slovenian PrvaLiga
2015–16 Slovenian Football Cup
2015–16 UEFA Europa League

References

External links
Official website  
PrvaLiga profile 
Official UEFA profile
Twitter profile
YouTube profile
Facebook profile

Slovenian football clubs 2015–16 season
2015–16 UEFA Europa League participants seasons
2015–16